Ramzes Tlyakodugov (rus. Рамзес Тлякодугов; born 12 December 1976) is a retired Russian (Circassian) bodybuilder and the winner of the prestigious NABBA World Championships  bodybuilder title and Vice Mr. Universe (NABBA and NAC) and Vice champion the IFBB Men's European BB & Classic BB Championships.

Achievements
 2008: European Amateur Championships – IFBB, Super-HeavyWeight, 2nd;
 2010: World Championships – NABBA, Medium-Tall, 1st;
 2011: Mr Universe – NABBA, Tall, 2nd; Universe – NAC, Medium-Tall, 2nd;
 2016: Mr Olympia Amateur -IFBB, 3rd;

See also

 List of male professional bodybuilders

References

External links
 Vice European champion IFBB: IFBB Men's European BB & Classic BB Championships results, 2008 
 World champion NABBA: NABBA World Championships results, 2010
 World champion NABBA video: 
 Vice Mr Universe: NABBA Universe results, 2011
 Vice Mr Universe: NAC Universe results, 2011
 Profile om musclememory.com 

1976 births
Living people
Russian bodybuilders
Professional bodybuilders